The Practice is an American legal drama TV series.

The Practice may also refer to:

The Practice (1976 TV series), a situation comedy starring Danny Thomas that aired on NBC from 1976 to 1977
The Practice (1985 TV series), a short lived UK medical drama produced by Granada Television.
The Practice PLC a company providing primary care in England

See also 

Practice (disambiguation)